Remouillé is a commune in the Loire-Atlantique department in western France.

Its name comes from the Poitevin language "remoulyum" which means wet.

History
The village was partly burned during the War in the Vendée in 1794.

Population

See also
Communes of the Loire-Atlantique department

References

Communes of Loire-Atlantique